The Gold Coast Classic was a professional golf tournament played at Coolangatta & Tweed Heads Golf Club in northern New South Wales, Australia. It was held from 1978 to 1983. From 1979 to 1983 it was sponsored by Tooth and Co., a beer brewery, initially under their name but from 1982 under the name Resch's Pilsner.

There was a playoff in the inaugural event. Four holes of a sudden-death playoff were played on the Sunday evening before darkness forced a suspension.  Played resumed at 9 am the following day. Mike Cahill won at the seventh extra hole, making a birdie 4.

Winners

References 

Golf tournaments in Australia
Golf in New South Wales
Golf in Queensland
Coolangatta
Sport in Tweed Heads, New South Wales
Sport on the Gold Coast, Queensland